is Toei's twenty-sixth production of the Super Sentai metaseries. It aired from February 17, 2002 to February 9, 2003, replacing Hyakujuu Sentai Gaoranger and was replaced by Bakuryū Sentai Abaranger. Its footage was used in the American series, Power Rangers Ninja Storm (the end credits listed the show as titled Hurricane Rangers). On April 1, 2013, Shun Shioya, Nao Nagasawa, Kohei Yamamoto, Yujiro Shirakawa, and Nobuo Kyo, who played Hurricane Red, Hurricane Blue, Hurricane Yellow, Kabuto Raijer, and Kuwaga Raijer, respectively, announced that a tenth-anniversary V-Cinema release called Ninpuu Sentai Hurricaneger: 10 Years After would be produced. This is the first time a movie has been made commemorating the anniversary of a single Sentai series. The movie is a direct to DVD and Blu-ray release. Shout! Factory released Ninpuu Sentai Hurricaneger: The Complete Series in North America on March 26, 2019. This is the twelfth Super Sentai series to be released in North America. It aired alongside Kamen Rider Ryuki.

Hurricaneger is the first Super Sentai series to officially celebrate its own 20th anniversary, with a V-cinext release for this occasion debuting in 2022.

Plot
Three misfit pupils of the Hayate-Style Ninja School, who are given a rigorous training regiment by their sensei Mugensai Hinata, are the only survivors when most of their peers were slaughtered during the graduation ceremony by a group of evil space ninjas known as the Jakanja that serve a mysterious power hidden on Earth. Mugensai, who turned himself into a hamster to evade his pursuers, and his daughter Oboro Hinata recruit the trio to become the legendary Hurricanegers to fight Jakanja. The Hurricanegers are joined by the Gouraigers of the Ikazuchi-Style Ninja School, who were initially their enemies, and later the mysterious Shurikenger who unites the two ninja groups to stop Jakanja from acquiring the mysterious power.

Characters

Hurricanegers
Three ninja students in the 507th class who are the survivors of the  ninja school, are mastering their school's  ninjutsu. They represent the Hayate Heart embodying the "Presistence of the Future". Their arsenal revolving around the  discs, the Hurricanegers transform by using the  brace and use the  hang gliders for transportation. They are armed with the  ninjatō, which has an alternate rifle mode accessed by combining with its sheath.

Senpuujin can combine with Gouraijin and a  combination known as  into  via . Alternatively, it can combine with Gouraijin, Tenkuujin, and the  combination to form  via .

  The leader of the team, his courageous determination making up for his slow-thinking. Long after the Jakanja's defeat, while aiding the Abarangers and then the Gokaigers, Yousuke became a handyman who travels around the world. During his travels, six months prior to the events of Ninpuu Sentai Hurricaneger: 10 Years After, Yousuke befriends Tenkai and is forced by Bat Ze Runba to attack Space Union Ninja School branches while stealing his teammates' Shinobi Medals. But with his friends' help, Yousuke frees Tenkai and becomes a mentor to the boy.
  A kunoichi who dreams of becoming a popstar, working under the stage name Nana. After the final battle, aiding the Abarangers, the Boukengers by having her "Friendship Spirit" empower DaiVoyager, and the Gokaigers, Nanami became a successful singer of international fame and hopes to be an actress.
  A firm believer in planning whose friendly nature allows him to at a daycare center. Long after the Jakanja's defeat, aiding the Abarangers and then the Gokaigers, Kouta married and had a daughter named Suzune as well as a son named Riku. Though he attempted to conceal his activities as ninja from his family, Kouta considers telling them the truth after the events of Ninpuu Sentai Hurricaneger: 10 Years After.

Gouraigers
 are two brothers who are the surviving students of the  ninja academy, originally the enemies of the Hurricaneger who join the Jakanja despite having wiped out the Ikazuchi Way's Ninja Academy which left the Kasumi brothers as the only survivors. The brothers obtained the forbidden Gouraiger system from their father, a rogue ninja who abused them. Ikki went against the Ikazuchi Way's wishes to obtain the Evil Will after learning of it during his mission in Egypt and learned of the "Final Secret" at the time of a meteor shower. He went against his school's wishes by creating the Gouraiger system and making his sons kill each other to evoke it while making them believe that rage and hatred would only promote strength. Though they eventually allied themselves with the Hurricanegers the Kasumi brothers were unable to completely forsake their father's cruel teachings and have a jaded view on life. The two work as construction workers before parting ways after the final battle with the Jakanja. They represent the Ikazuchi Heart embodying the Bonds of the Past.

Their arsenal revolving around the Shinobi Medals, the Gouraigers transform by using the  brace and use the  motorcycles for transportation. The Gouraigers combine their personal weapons to form the
When facing enlarged Jakanja members, the Gouraigers summon their Shinobi Machines and form  via .

 The older brother of Isshuu, originally intending to make Ikazuchi as the greatest ninja school using the Evil Will. But Ikkou abandoned it and decides to support the Hurricanegers, becoming Yousuke's rival while making a mortal enemy out of Manmaruba when the alien sought revenge the Kasumi brothers for making a fool out of him. Long after the Jakanja's defeat, aiding the Abarangers prior to becoming estranged from his brother, Ikkou becomes a member of the JunRetsu singing group. During the events of Ninpuu Sentai Hurricaneger: 10 Years After, Ikkou helps Yousuke remember the good they did together before helping him save Tenkai.
 The younger brother of Ikkou who originally resented his school for staying in the shadows, idolizing his brother and respecting most of his decisions. But Isshuu took the fact they were not rebuilding their ninja school personally until he found the resting place of his father's blade, the  naginata. Desiring to rebuild the Ikazuchi School, Isshuu used the blade with disastrous results. After learning to use the Kiraimaru in a way where his friends would not be harmed, Isshuu decides to rebuild the school after Jakanja is defeated. By the events of Ninpuu Sentai Hurricaneger: 10 Years After, having left Ikkou's shadow, Isshu became a lady's man and eventually made peace with his brother.

Shurikenger
 is the green-suited  who is able to transform via the  device. He is armed with the  katana, which has an alternate baseball bat mode accessed by combining with its sheath. He can also assume , rotating the top of his helmet while removing the weight inhibitor serving as chest armor to increase his physical abilities. When facing enlarged Jakanja members, Shurikenger summons  and changes it from helicopter mode to robot mode via .

A somewhat comical figure, Shurikenger often used broken English phrases including the famous "I am Ninja of Ninja!" and also often poorly mixes both Japanese and English into his sentences. He usually disguises himself as a 'regular' person until he reverts to his true form with the Shuriken Ball device when confronted by Jakanja. Though Shurikenger seemed to have died after being mortally wounded by Sandaru and using Tenkuujin to take out Satorakura, he mysteriously reappears to aid his allies and the Abarangers and is last seen overseeing the Ninningers' progress under request of Toha Yamaji.
  A mysterious 10-year-old boy who appears during the events of Ninpuu Sentai Hurricaneger: 10 Years After, taken under Yousuke's wing as traveling companion six months prior as Tenkai lacked any memory of his life before. But kidnapped by Bat Ze Runba, Tenkai is revealed to be the embodiment of the Great Force that manifested after the Hurricaneger/Gouraiger teams defeated Tau Zanto. Though Runba succeeded in awakening the Great Force, Tenkai manages to suppress it and gains the ability to become the new Shurikenger with the resolve to use his powers for good as he becomes Yousuke's apprentice. Unlike his predecessor, though he possesses the same capabilities, Tenkai does not use broken English phrases in his sentences.

Allies
Despite his form, he can fight and communicated with Gozen before she revealed herself. While Mugensai temporary restored during the events of the movie by Laiina until she left Earth, he regains his humanity in the finale and graduates the Hurricanegers and the Gouraigers two months after their battle with Tau Zant.
  Mugensai's scholarly daughter and the director of the  who provides the Hurricanegers' arsenal, being their senpai due to her being a member of the 487th graduating class. She also invented the robot kuroko that mind-wipe out the ninjas' existence from civilians those who left Hayate-Style to ensure their school's secrecy.
  A 500-year-old seemingly young woman who is the daughter of a feudal lord who died protecting her before she went into hiding as Lady Gozen with Shurikenger as her protector while some of her descendants become members of the Space Unified Ninja School she established. But Gozen refrains from any form of sadness to maintain the seal placed on the Grieving Bow. After moving in with the Hurricanegers after her location is compromised, Gozen learned of how much the world changed during her solitude while seeing the ninja are true heroes despite her earlier impressions. But Sandaaru learned of the seal, killing her once it is undone. During the events of Ninpuu Sentai Hurricaneger: 10 Years After, the Hurricanegers meet another Lady Gozen who is a blood relative of Kagura's and was entrusted with Shurikenger's Shinobi Medal before it was stolen.

Space Ninja Clan Jakanja
Each one leads their own Ninja Corps. Their goal is to bring Earth to ruins to invoke , the  that would form in the depths of the ocean before destroying the universe. But when Tau Zanto assumes his ultimate form the Centipede is destroyed in the transformation, Furabiijo and Wendinu are among the survivors.

  Jankanja's leader, an Ōmukade-like demon with various faces on his segments who desires the Evil Force's power to wipe out the universe and create a new one he intends to rule. But Tau Zant is shrunk down to human size and is finally destroyed by the ninjas using the Victory Gadget.
  A kunoichi dropout in a bee headdress and a user of the bee ninja art who Tau Zant recruited, carrying a notepad she uses to grade Space Ninja members sent to attack Earth. She once acted on her own by creating the android Furabijenu, who briefly forced her out of Jakanja before manipulating Nanami into creating a remote control for her creation. Following the series finale, assumed to have been killed, Furabiijo and Wendinu ended up on Dino Earth where they attempted to ally themselves with the Evoliens during the events of Abaranger vs. Hurricaneger. Furabiijo later resurfaces briefly in GoGo Sentai Boukenger vs. Super Sentai as a key ingredient in Chronos's plans, making a return appearance in Ninpuu Sentai Hurricaneger: 10 Years After as a supporter of Bat Ze Runba before taking her leave. 
Chuuzubo bore a grudge against the Gouraigers when they allowed his friend Octonyuudo to get killed, his actions against them resulting in them joining the Hurricanegers. Chuuzubo later uses the forbidden Dark Soul Summoning Ninja Art to enlarge himself with an increase in his power by sacrificing his life, overpowering the two ninja teams before being destroyed by Gourai Senpuujin.
  Tau Zant's most valuable servant due to his ability to see the fixed future, Manmaruba developed a grudge against Ikkou after seeing his future death. Following Chuuzubo's death, Manmaruba undergoes a pupa state to become the scorpion-like  to exact his revenge by infecting Ikkou with both a deadly Space Scorpion and its egg while foreseeing his own death by Ikkou's hand. While Hurricane Red averted Ikkou's death, Manmaruba creates a stronger clone of himself to continue in his place. The new Manmaruba's psychic power allows him to see a meteor shower allowing him to fully reveal the means to acquire the Evil Force, but the exposure mutates him into the mindless scorpion monster  that is destroyed by Tenrai Senpuujin.
  A snake ninja art mistress of disguise who appears on Earth with Furabiijo as the one who enlarges the Space Ninjas, occasionally called by her partner as "Wendy". Wendinu was made a Dark Spear due to her unique ability to grow into a giant super-strong berserker after amassing enough stress and rage in her. In that crazed state of mind, Wendinu destroys an entire planet single-handedly. After Manmaruba's death, Wendinu follows her own plan in setting up her own Wendinu Cram School scheme using brainwashed children to kill the ninja for her. In the process, she falls head over heels in love with a young man named Hashimoto. Once her plan failed Wendinu's rage reaches its zenith and she grows, overpowering the Karakuri Giants until the presence of Hashimoto causes her to shrink back to normal size. Following the series finale, assumed to have been killed, Wendinu and Furabiijo ended up on Dino Earth where they attempted to ally themselves with the Evolians during the events of Abaranger vs. Hurricaneger. Wendinu later resurfaces in Ninpuu Sentai Hurricaneger: 10 Years After as a supporter of Bat Ze Runba before taking her leave. 
Despite appearances, Sargain is actually a cyborg ant piloting a puppet body equipped with the Dark Twin Swords Ganryuken from his shoulders. He also builds his own personal robots to fight the ninjas. Receiving the Raging Arrow from Sandaaru to unlock its power Sargain learns that it functions like the Shinobi Medals. Though he unlocked the Raging Arrow he lost it when Gaingain was destroyed. Though he survives the destruction of Gaingain, he is cut down with his own blade by Sadaaru as he had no more need of him. 
  A peacock/evil clown-like trickster with an Owarai-type personality who replaces Chuuzubo, commanding the  who Wendinu revives into giants with a boomerang. When the Evil Force's coming approaches, Satarakura makes his moves during the final Meteor Shower by using the Jaykumu Gun created from Sargain's data to suck the energy out of people and extracting the rage and sadness for Tau Zant. Satarakura was stopped by the Earth ninjas but Tau Zant saves him to preserve the Jaykumu Gun as it fused to his arm and drained him of his own energy. Taking advantage Satarakura uses the energy of the Jakyumu Gun to overpower the ninjas and take their energy. Sandaaru arrives once the Jakyumu Gun's energy pack is full and takes it before attempting to kill Satarakura. Though Satarakura survives, his mask is broken and his mind shattered turning him into a hateful psychopath intent on killing both sides. It takes Tenkuujin's self-destruct to finally kill him. 
After he obtained the Raging Arrow from Astrom, he became the most powerful of all the Seven Dark Spears with aspirations of taking over Jakanja. With the exception of Sargain and Tau Zant, who played along, Sandaaru wins the other Jakanja members over while convincing them to all attack together rather than individually. After using the Earth Ninjas to power the Raging Arrow, Sandaaru uses Sargain to devise a method for its use before secretly killing him once making a copy of Sargain's Karakuri Ball system. It was only after acquiring the Grieving Bow from Gozen that Sandaaru learns Tau Zant was using him the entire time and reveals his true colors after the destruction of the Centipede. Surviving the Victory Gadget, Sandaaru enlarges himself and overpowers Revolver Gourai Senpuujin. At the last second, the Gouraigers are forced to sacrifice Gouraijin to kill Sandaaru.
  Low-ranked ninjas that serve as the Jankanja's foot soldiers.

Alien Ninja Corps

The Alien Ninja Corpse are a group of ninjas that are led by Wendinu and are modeled after animals and plant life.

Puppet Ninja Corps

The Puppet Ninja Corps are a group of robotic ninjas that are created by Sargain resemble organic/inorganic hybrids.

Masked Ninja Corps

The Masked Ninja Corps are a group of ninjas led by Sataraku who wear masks, are inspired by body parts, and have side-jobs when not being in use.

Fan Ninja Corps

The Fan Ninja Corps are a group of mythical beast-themed ninjas that are led by Sandaaru.

Other members
  A bee-themed robot that Furabiijo created in her image and 300 times more powerful, ultimately proving to be far superior enough to Furabiijo that she was kicked out while Furabijenu plotted to raise up the ranks until she takes over Jakanja. But Furabiijo tricked Nanami in building a remote control to regain control over Furabijenu, who is destroyed by Hurricane Blue with her Copy Giant version destroyed by Senpuujin using Pitashito Hitode.
  Three wolf-like demons that survived Jakanja's attack on the B-Strike Hell Nebula, able to turn their victims into werewolves by eating their shadows. The three Fangule, Brown Destruction, Black Beginning and Silver Emergency, were made into pets by Satarakura that he set loose on the day of the second meteor shower via Tau Zant's plan to evoke the Evil Force. Though the Earth Ninja manage to obliterate the Fangule, they reform at Satokura's call while merging into the three-faced  to complete the ideal setting for the Evil Force's coming. Despite being momentarily split back into the Fangule while Satokura's whistle was broken, Fangerus overpowers the Karakuri Giants until Revolver Mammoth arrives with the monster destroyed by Revolver Gourai Senpuujin.

Episodes
At the end of each episode, there is a short Ninja File segment on a Jakanja the Hurricanegers dealt with. All of the episodes in the show are called "Scrolls".

Production
The trademark for the series was filed by Toei Company on November 22, 2001.

Film
 is a 2002 film, which takes place between episodes 25 and 26.

V-Cinema releases
: A 2003 V-Cinema release, which takes place between episodes 30 and 31.
: A 2004 V-Cinema release, which takes place between episodes 40 and 41 of Bakuryū Sentai Abaranger.
: A 2007 V-Cinema release, which takes place between episodes 42 and 43 of GoGo Sentai Boukenger.
: A 2013 V-Cinema release, which takes place after the final episode of the series.
: An upcoming 2023 V-Cinema release.

Specials
: A 2002 Kodansha Super Video special.
: A 2022 Toei Tokusatsu Fan Club-exclusive special.

Cast
Yousuke Shiina: 
Nanami Nono: 
Kouta Bitou: 
Ikkou Kasumi: 
Isshuu Kasumi: 
Furabiijo: 
Wendinu: 
: 
Kagura (Lady Gozen), Inquirer (10 Years After): 
Mugensai Hinata: 
Oboro Hinata:

Voice actors
Shurikenger: 
Tau Zanto: 
Chuuzubo: 
Manmaruba: 
Sargain: 
Satarakura: 
andaaru: 
Narrator, Fuuraimaru,  (10 Years After):

Guest cast

Ikki Kasumi (15-18, 31): 
: 
: 
: 
: 
: 
: 
: 
: 
: 
: 
:

Film and direct-to-video guest cast
: 
: 
, : 
: 
: Yūji Kishi
Tenkai (10 Years After):

Songs
Opening theme

Lyrics: 
Composition & Arrangement: 
Artist: Hideaki Takatori

Ending theme

Lyrics & Composition: Hideaki Takatori
Arrangement: Hiromasa Kagoshima
Artist: Hironobu Kageyama

International Broadcasts and Home Video
The series was limited to only airing in Asian regions outside of Japan, as most international regions have aired the Power Rangers adaptation, Power Rangers Ninja Storm instead.
In Thailand, the series was given a Thai dub and aired on Channel 5 in 2004. But however, only 48 out of 51 episodes were broadcast. Rose Media Entertainment (formerly Rose Video) held the home video rights to the series with all episodes released, dubbed in Thai.
In the Chinese-speaking world, Both Mandarin (Taiwan dialect) and Cantonese dubs were produced and aired in Taiwan and Hong Kong respectively.
In Taiwan, the series aired with a Taiwanese Mandarin dub on October 3, 2004, until September 25, 2005 with all episodes dubbed, airing on GTV.
In Hong Kong, the series aired with a Cantonese Chinese dub on March 6, 2005 (a few months after Taiwan aired the Taiwanese Mandarin dub) on TVB Jade until March 12, 2006 with all episodes dubbed.
In North America, the series would receive a DVD release by Shout! Factory on March 26, 2019 in the original Japanese audio with English subtitles. It is the twelfth Super Sentai series to be officially released in the region.

Notes

References

External links
 
 
 at Super-Sentai.net 
 for Ninpuu Sentai Hurricaneger de Gozaru! Shushutto 20th Anniversary 

..

2002 Japanese television series debuts
2003 Japanese television series endings
Fictional ninja
Martial arts television series
Ninja fiction
Super Sentai
Japanese action television series
Japanese fantasy television series
Japanese science fiction television series